State of Shock is D.I.'s fifth full-length studio album. It was released in 1994 via Doctor Dream Records. The album marked a reunion with original drummer John Knight, who had departed after 1986's Horse Bites Dog Cries.

Critical reception
AllMusic wrote that the album "confounds the stereotypes of ... re-formations by sounding authentic and energetic while featuring some of the best material the band has released." The Los Angeles Times wrote: "Still vigorous at 35, [Casey] Royer shows that, even for an inveterate and unchanging punk, there is a livable middle way between Neil Young's dreaded rust and a premature crash-and-burn. It's not a bad example for a big brother to set for a new generation of punk rock youth."

Track listing
 "Hated" (Michael Calabro, John Knight, Casey Royer) — 3:22
 "Clownhouse" (Calabro, Knight, Royer) — 2:54
 "What Is Life?" (Royer, Fredric Taccone)  — 3:17
 "Runaround" (Calabro, Knight, Royer) — 2:13
 "Colors and Blood" (Taccone) — 3:00
 "It's Not Right" (Royer, Taccone) — 2:45
 "Paranoid's Demise" (Royer, Taccone)— 2:53
 "Dream" (Taccone, Nichols, Royer) — 2:35
 "Better Than Expected" (Royer, Taccone) — 3:06
 "Martyr Man" (Calabro, Taccone, Knight, Royer) — 4:33
 "Lexicon Devil" (Darby Crash, Pat Smear) — 1:47

Cleopatra Re-release Bonus Tracks
"Two Girls, One Stein" — 3:01	
"Hysteria" — 2:18		
"Buttons" — 3:14
"Loser" — 2:40

Personnel
 Casey Royer - Lead Vocals
 Michael Calabro - Guitars
 Fredric Taccone - Bass
 John Knight - Drums
 Steve Lyen - Drums
 Tim Maag - Guitars

References

1994 albums
D.I. (band) albums